Closed circuit can refer to:
Closed-circuit television
Closed-circuit radio
Rebreather – breathing sets
Closed Circuit (1978 film), a 1978 Italian film
Closed Circuit (2013 film), a 2013 British thriller film
An electric circuit is a "closed circuit" if it contains a complete path between the positive and negative terminals of its power source
 Closed Circuit (album), a 2001 album by New Zealand composer Peter Jefferies